Iuliia Sergeevna Artemeva (born 16 March 2005) is a Russian pair skater. With her former partner, Mikhail Nazarychev, she is the 2021 Gran Premio d'Italia bronze medalist.

On the junior level, Artemeva/Nazarychev are the 2020 World Junior bronze medalists, the 2020 Russian junior national bronze medalists, the 2019 JGP Croatia champions, the 2019 JGP Russia silver medalists, and 2019–20 Junior Grand Prix Final qualifiers.

Career

Early years 
Artemeva began learning how to skate in 2008 at the age of three. Up until the end of 2017–18 figure skating season, she trained as a single skater in her hometown of Kazan at the Strela Youth Sports School. Coached by Svetlana Romanova and Rezeda Sibgatullina, she finished 14th at 2018 Russian Younger Age Nationals. Artemeva made the transition to pairs at the beginning of the 2018–19 figure skating season, teaming up with current partner Mikhail Nazarychev and relocating to Perm. Artemeva/Nazarychev only competed domestically during the 2018–19 season and finished 10th at 2019 Russian Elder Age Nationals.

2019–20 season 
Artemeva/Nazarychev made their international junior debut in September at the 2019 JGP Russia. The team placed second in both their short program and their free skate to earn a silver medal on the all-Russian podium between teammates Kseniia Akhanteva / Valerii Kolesov and Diana Mukhametzianova / Ilya Mironov. At their second Junior Grand Prix assignment, 2019 JGP Croatia, Artemeva/Nazarychev won gold and set new personal bests after placing second in the short program and first in the free skate, thus qualifying to the 2019–20 Junior Grand Prix Final. In qualifying to the Final, Artemeva/Nazarychev secured byes into the 2020 Russian Championships on both the senior and junior levels. They placed fourth at the Final.

Seventh at the senior nationals, they were bronze medalists at junior nationals, securing a place at the 2020 World Junior Championships in Tallinn, Estonia. Artemeva/Nazarychev were third in the short program, narrowly behind second-place finishers Akhanteva/Kolesov.  The free skate proved a struggle, Artemeva falling on both throw jumps as well as her side-by-side double Axel attempt. They nevertheless remained in bronze medal position, aided by errors by fourth-place finishers Hocke/Kunkel of Germany.

2020–21 season 
Artemeva/Nazarychev made their Grand Prix debut at the 2020 Rostelecom Cup, where they finished fifth.  They placed eighth at the 2021 Russian Championships and then won the Russian junior national title.

2021–22 season 
Artemeva/Nazarychev were initially assigned to the 2021 Cup of China as their first Grand Prix, but following the event's cancellation they were reassigned to the 2021 Gran Premio d'Italia. Fourth in the short program, they rose to third in the free skate to win the bronze medal behind Chinese teams Sui/Han and Peng/Jin. At their second event, the 2021 Internationaux de France, they placed second in both programs to take the silver medal, making only one error in their free skate when Artemeva doubled and stepped out of her planned triple toe loop. Nazarychev said afterward, "overall, it was a good performance. We set goals for ourselves to do well on the Grand Prix, and I think we fulfilled that."

At the 2022 Russian Championships, Artemeva/Nazarychev finished in fifth. They also competed at the junior edition, losing to Natalia Khabibullina / Ilya Knyazhuk. On 2 June 2022, it was announced that Artemeva/Nazarychev had ended their partnership. Artemeva teamed up with Aleksei Briukhanov.

Programs

With Briukhanov

With Nazarychev

Competitive highlights 
GP: Grand Prix; CS: Challenger Series; JGP: Junior Grand Prix

With Briukhanov

With Nazarychev

Detailed results 

Small medals for short and free programs awarded only at ISU Championships. Personal bests highlighted in bold.

With Briukhanov

With Nazarychev

Senior results

Junior results

References

External links 
 

2005 births
Russian female pair skaters
Living people
Sportspeople from Kazan
World Junior Figure Skating Championships medalists